Penicillium glycyrrhizacola is a species of the genus of Penicillium.

References

glycyrrhizacola
Fungi described in 2013